Abavorana is a genus of true frogs found in Southeast Asia, namely the Malay Peninsula, Sumatra, and Borneo. Species in this genus were formerly classified in the genus Hylarana, but were reclassified into the new genus Abavorana following a 2015 phylogenetic revision of Hylarana.

Species 
There are three species in this genus:

 Abavorana decorata (Moquard, 1890)
 Abavorana luctuosa (Peters, 1871)
 Abavorana nazgul Quah, Anuar, Grismer, Wood, Azizah, and Muin, 2017

References 

Abavorana
True frogs
Amphibians of Asia
Amphibian genera